Young, Gifted and Black is the eighteenth studio album by American singer-songwriter Aretha Franklin, released in early 1972, by Atlantic Records. The album climbed to #2 on Billboard's R&B albums survey and peaked at #11 on the main album chart. It was quickly certified Gold by the RIAA. Its title was cut from "To Be Young, Gifted and Black", recorded and released by Nina Simone in 1969.

Franklin won a 1972 Grammy Award for Best Female R&B Vocal Performance.

In 2003, the television network VH1 named it the 76th greatest album of all time. In 2020, it was ranked number 388 by Rolling Stone in their list of the 500 Greatest Albums of All Time.

Songs
Young, Gifted and Black contains original songs written and performed by Franklin, such as "Day Dreaming" and "Rock Steady". It also features cover versions of songs by other artists, including "To Be Young, Gifted and Black" by Nina Simone, as well as "I've Been Loving You Too Long" by Otis Redding, "The Long and Winding Road" by the Beatles, and "Border Song (Holy Moses)" by Elton John.

Critical reception
Jason Birchmeier of AllMusic wrote that "Young, Gifted and Black certainly ranks highly among [Franklin's] studio efforts, with many arguing that it may be her greatest. [...] If you really want to go song by song, you'd be hard-pressed to find any throwaways here -- this is quite honestly an album that merits play from beginning to end."

In 2003, the television network VH1 named Young, Gifted and Black the 76th greatest album of all time. In 2020, the album was ranked number 388 by Rolling Stone in their list of the 500 Greatest Albums of All Time.

In 2018, Rolling Stone writer Rob Sheffield praised Franklin's cover of "The Long and Winding Road" from the album as "the greatest of all Beatle covers — the one that improves most on the original and defines everything the song is about."

Track listing

Personnel

 Aretha Franklin – lead vocals (all), piano (1-4, 6, 8-12), celesta (5), piano, Fender Rhodes (7)
 Cornell Dupree – guitar (2-5, 7-12)
 Hugh McCracken – guitar (1, 6)
 Don Arnone – acoustic guitar (2)
 Donny Hathaway – Hammond organ (1, 3, 5, 6, 8, 9), piano, Fender Rhodes (2)
 Billy Preston – Hammond organ (4, 10, 12)
 Chuck Rainey – bass guitar (2-5, 7, 9-12)
 Eric Gale – bass guitar (1, 6)
 Robert Popwell – bass guitar (8), percussion (3)
 Bernard Purdie – drums (2, 3, 5, 7, 8, 11)
 Ray Lucas – drums (4, 10, 12)
 Al Jackson Jr. – drums (1, 6)
 Dr. John – percussion (3)
 The Memphis Horns – horns (3, 8)
 Neal Rosengarden – trumpet (9), vibraphone (5)
 Hubert Laws – flute (2, 7, 11)
 Pat Smith – backing vocals (2, 3, 5, 7–9, 11)
 Carolyn Franklin – backing vocals (2, 3, 5, 8-10)
 Erma Franklin – backing vocals (2, 3, 5, 8-10)
 Margaret Branch – backing vocals (2, 3, 5, 7-11)
 Ann S. Clark – backing vocals (2, 3, 5, 7–9, 11)
 The Sweet Inspirations – backing vocals (1, 4, 6, 12)
 Ronald Bright – backing vocals (12)
 J. R. Bailey – backing vocals (12)
 Sammy Turner – backing vocals (12)

Chart positions

Singles

References

1972 albums
Aretha Franklin albums
Albums produced by Tom Dowd
Albums produced by Arif Mardin
Albums produced by Jerry Wexler
Atlantic Records albums
Rhino Records albums